William Tunberg was an American screenwriter.
  
He wrote the screenplay for Old Yeller and That's My Baby!. His son, Karl Alexander, was a writer too. His brother, Karl Tunberg, wrote the screenplay for Ben-Hur—and worked on a number of films himself.

References

Year of birth missing
Year of death missing
American screenwriters